Quirauk Mountain is the highest point on South Mountain. The  peak is located in northeastern Washington County, Maryland.  It lies just southwest of Fort Ritchie Military Reservation in the village of Cascade and about 1/2 mile southeast of the community of Blue Mountain.  The Appalachian Trail and South Mountain State Park are about 1/2 mile to the west of the mountain's summit.

Background
On the summit is a broadcast tower for radio stations WETH-FM and WAYZ-FM (in Hagerstown) and "Site C", a radio communication outpost of the Alternate Joint Communications Center, a United States Department of Defense emergency relocation site near Blue Ridge Summit, Pennsylvania. There is a fenced-in area of the mountaintop that is federal property and thus a restricted area. Quirauk Mountain's broadcast tower was formerly used by radio stations WJEJ-AM  and WWMD-FM. A fire lookout tower also used to occupy the summit.

About 1/2 mile to the west-southwest of the summit is High Rock (on the Appalachian Trail), which provides an excellent view of the surrounding countryside.

References

Mountains of Maryland
South Mountain Range (Maryland−Pennsylvania)
Landforms of Washington County, Maryland